"Bossa Nova Baby" is a song recorded by Elvis Presley on January 22, 1963, at Radio Recorders in Hollywood, CA as part of the soundtrack of the 1963 motion picture Fun in Acapulco. It was released as a single that year reaching the Top Ten in the U.S. It was written by Jerry Leiber and Mike Stoller.

Background
The song was written by the songwriting duo Jerry Leiber and Mike Stoller. The song was initially given to Tippie and the Clovers, who recorded and released the song on Leiber and Stoller own label Tiger Records in 1962. It was recorded with a samba rhythm and a Farfisa hook with an arrangement by Alan Lorber. However, this version flopped and did not chart.

Elvis Presley recorded the song for the 1963 motion picture Fun in Acapulco, despite the song having little to do with Acapulco or bossa nova. The Elvis Presley version was in a rock and roll style with an organ riff, electric guitar and a mariachi band.

The song reached number eight on the Billboard Hot 100 pop chart and number 20 on the Billboard R&B Singles chart in 1963. It also reached number 13 in the UK charts.

Elvis' recording appeared on the 1968 compilation album Elvis' Gold Records, Volume 4. The Elvis RCA Victor recording appeared in the 2011 romantic comedy film No Strings Attached starring Natalie Portman and Ashton Kutcher.

Personnel

Elvis Presley – vocals
The Jordanaires – backing vocals
The Amigos – backing vocals
Tony Terran – trumpet
Rudolph Loera – trumpet
Scotty Moore – electric guitar
Barney Kessel – acoustic guitar
Tiny Timbrell – acoustic guitar, mandolin
Dudley Brooks – piano
Ray Siegel – double bass
Emil Radocchi – percussion
D. J. Fontana – drums
Hal Blaine – drums

Charts

Sources

Further reading
 

Elvis Presley songs
1963 singles
1962 songs
Songs written by Jerry Leiber and Mike Stoller
RCA Victor singles
Bossa nova songs
Songs about dancing
The Clovers songs